Har HaMenuchot (Ashkenazi pronunciation, Har HaMenuchos, lit. "Mount of Those who are Resting", also known as Givat Shaul Cemetery) is the largest cemetery in Jerusalem. The hilltop burial ground lies at the western edge of the city adjacent to the neighborhood of Givat Shaul, with commanding views of Mevaseret Zion to the north, Motza to the west, and Har Nof to the south. As of 2008, the cemetery encompasses  in which over 150,000 people are buried.

History

Until 1948, Jewish burials in Jerusalem were conducted in the millennia-old Jewish cemetery on the Mount of Olives. In 1948, the Arab siege of Jerusalem cut off access to the Mount of Olives, and this remained the status quo after the 1949 Armistice Agreements. In 1948 several temporary cemeteries opened to handle wartime deaths in Jerusalem, including the Sanhedria cemetery, Sheikh Badr Cemetery, and the Shaare Zedek Cemetery (on the grounds of the old Shaare Zedek Hospital on Jaffa Road). After the establishment of the state, however, these were deemed inadequate for the needs of a growing city.

In late summer 1948, developers identified a  hilltop located between Givat Shaul and Motza and overlooking Highway 1. It was outside the boundaries of Jerusalem at that time, yet accessible to the city, and it had soft rock for grave-digging. They calculated that each dunam would accommodate 200 graves and estimated a need for 1,000 graves per year. At the time, the city of Jerusalem had 150,000 Jewish residents with a mortality rate of 1,000 annually; at that rate, the new cemetery was expected to suffice for the next 40 years.

The developers received permission to build the cemetery a month later, but disagreements between the various burial societies delayed the first burial until the fall of 1951. With the opening of the new cemetery, civilian graves were transferred here from the temporary cemeteries at Sheikh Badr and the old Shaare Zedek Hospital.

In 1951 a new cemetery was established at Mount Herzl, dedicated by government decision as Israel's national cemetery, where national leaders and fallen soldiers would be interred.

By 1988 Har HaMenuchot had about 50,000 graves. In the 1990s developers began expanding the cemetery onto the northern and western slopes of the hill. By 2008 the cemetery spanned  in which more than 150,000 people are interred.

In November 2012 the Jerusalem municipality approved a plan to shield the view of the cemetery from Highway 1, the main entryway to Jerusalem, by planting cypress trees and erecting a stone wall. The plan would allow for continued expansion of the cemetery to the north and west.

Operation
The graves on Har HaMenuchot are divided into sections operated by various chevrei kadisha (burial societies). The Kehillat Yerushalayim burial society was allotted more than 50% of the land when the cemetery opened. Other sections were apportioned to burial societies serving the Ashkenazim (also known as Perushim), Sephardim, and Hasidic communities of Jerusalem. In the late 1990s other chevrei kadisha opened, serving the Kurdish, Georgian, Yemenite, and Bukharan Jewish communities. The Kehillat Yerushalayim burial society also operates a special section reserved for those whose Jewish identity is questionable, such as non-Jewish immigrants and atheists. (Bona fide Christians and Muslims are not buried here, but rather in their own cemeteries.) Both the Kehillat Yerushalayim and the Sephardi burial societies maintain an on-site funeral parlor.

As the official municipal burial ground, Har HaMenuchot accommodates free burials for Israeli citizens and tourists who die while in Israel; the cost of the plot and funeral services is paid for by Bituah Leumi, the National Insurance Institute. However, the choice of plot is left to the burial society, and if a spouse wishes to be buried in the adjacent plot, he or she must pay for the second plot. According to the law, the burial society must reserve the plots on both sides of a newly dug grave for 90 days in order to give the spouse and relatives of the deceased the option to purchase them. According to the Kehillat Yerushalayim burial society, 90 percent of the burials at Har HaMenuchot involve couples. Stone monuments must be paid for by the family of the deceased. The burial societies recoup their development costs and make their profit on the sale of plots to Jews living abroad, with the price of the plot, burial costs, and transportation of the body by airline exceeding US$11,000. Burials from abroad constitute an estimated one-fifth to one-third of all burials.

Description

Like other Jewish cemeteries in Jerusalem, the plots on Har HaMenuchot consist of an underground grave topped by a rectangular platform of poured concrete, faced with stone tiles, that rises  or more above-ground. The name, date and praises of the deceased are inscribed on the top panel and occasionally on the sides. The writing is either engraved and filled in with black lead, or simply painted on. In some cases, names of family members of the deceased who were murdered in the Holocaust are engraved on the sides of the gravestone. Many graves include a small cavity hollowed out of the box, where memorial candles are placed.

The sections run by the Kehillat Yerushalayim and Perushim burial societies differ in appearance. The former is divided into color-coded sections that are easily reached by roadways, and has trees and bushes planted alongside the sections to provide shade for visitors on hot summer days. The Perushim section, on the other hand, abides by customs maintained in Jewish cemeteries for centuries, including the complete absence of trees or vegetation near the graves or even bordering the road.

Kohanim are interred in a separate section just outside the main entrance, so that their family members who are not allowed to enter cemeteries to avoid tumas meis (ritual impurity caused by the dead) may stand by the side of the road and pray at their ancestors' graves.

The cemetery contains a genizah (sacred texts repository) where kvitlach (prayer notes) from the Western Wall are buried.

In addition to visitor parking, the cemetery is serviced twice an hour by Egged bus number 54, which has its terminus at the Har Hotzvim terminal passes the Jerusalem Central Bus Station and Rav-Shefa Mall, and Kanfei Nesharim Street.

Points of interest

Near the main entrance lies the original Chelkat Harabbonim ("Rabbis' Section") operated by the Ashkenazi (Perushim) burial society, which includes the graves of many gedolim of the past 60 years from around the world. The largest grave in this section is that of Rabbi Aharon Rokeach, the fourth Belzer Rebbe, which has become a shrine for thousands of visitors annually. An area of dalet amos (four cubits) surrounds this grave. An iron parapet constructed nearby allows Kohanim to pray near the rabbinical graves without exposing themselves to tumah (ritual impurity). Another Chelkas Harabbonim is located on the north slope of the hill; this is the resting place for Rabbis Shlomo Wolbe, Nosson Meir Wachtfogel, and Yosef Shalom Elyashiv, among others.

A grave known as a segula (propitious remedy) for childless women is that of Miriam ha-Koveset (Miriam the Laundress), who only worked in the homes of Torah scholars, including Rabbi Yosef Shalom Elyashiv and the Zvhiller Rebbe, Rabbi Shlomo Goldman. Once Miriam asked the Zvhiller Rebbe for a blessing for children, but he blessed her that in her merit, others would merit to have children. Twenty-nine years after her death in 1964, one of her neighbors had a dream in which Miriam appeared to her, told her of the Zvhiller Rebbe's promise, and gave her directions to her grave. On her yahrzeit that year, busloads of women came to pray at the grave while a Torah scholar recited prayers for the elevation of her soul. There were 32 known cases of women who prayed at Miriam's grave and gave birth to children that year. Since then, her grave, located near the main parking lot, has been renovated and enlarged to accommodate women year-round.

Notable rabbis buried at Har HaMenuchot

 Yehezkel Abramsky, Av Beit Din of London
 Yaakov Ades, Sephardic gadol and member of the Jerusalem beth din
 Yehuda Amital, founder of Yeshivat Har Etzion, Meimad movement
 Gedaliah Anemer, av bet din of Washington, D.C. and founder of the Yeshiva of Greater Washington-Tiferet Gedaliah
 Baruch Ashlag, kabbalist
 Yehuda Ashlag, the Baal HaSulam
 Ezra Attiya, rosh yeshiva of Porat Yosef Yeshiva, Jerusalem
 Chaim Yehuda Leib Auerbach, rosh yeshiva of Shaar Hashamayim Yeshiva
 Shlomo Zalman Auerbach, Jerusalem posek
 Baruch Ben Haim, assistant chief rabbi of the Syrian Jewish community in Brooklyn, New York
 Zelig Reuven Bengis, rosh av beit din of Jerusalem
 Amram Blau, one of the founders of Neturei Karta
 Abraham Yochanan Blumenthal, founder of Zion Blumenthal Orphanage
 Nachman Bulman, rabbi in the United States and Israel
 Shlomo Carlebach, rabbi-songwriter
 Reb Chaim Daskal, Reb Chaim of Yerushalayim
 Akiva Ehrenfeld, Jerusalem rabbi
 Shmuel Ehrenfeld, the Mattersdorfer Rav
 Mordechai Eliyahu, former Sephardi chief rabbi of Israel
 Yosef Shalom Elyashiv, Lithuanian Orthodox gadol and posek
 Pesach Eliyahu Falk, Gateshead, Posek Hador
 Moshe Feinstein, American gadol and posek
 Binyomin Beinush Finkel, rosh yeshiva of Yeshivas Mir, Jerusalem
 Eliezer Yehuda Finkel, rosh yeshiva of Yeshivas Mir, Belarus and Jerusalem
 Eliyahu Boruch Finkel, rosh yeshiva of Yeshivas Mir, Jerusalem
 Nosson Tzvi Finkel, rosh yeshiva of Yeshivas Mir, Jerusalem
 Tzvi Pesach Frank, chief rabbi of Jerusalem
 Yozef Friedlander, Lisker Rebbe
 Yaakov Yosef Herman, Orthodox Jewish pioneer in the United States in the early 20th century.
 Yitzhak Kaduri, Sephardi kabbalist
 Meir Kahane, Kach party founder
 Jacob S. Kassin, chief rabbi of the Syrian Jewish community in Brooklyn, New York
 Chaim Mordechai Katz, rosh yeshiva of Telz-Cleveland
 Aharon Kotler, founder and rosh yeshiva of Beth Medrash Govoha, Lakewood, New Jersey
 Shneur Kotler, rosh yeshiva of Beth Medrash Govoha
 Chaim Kreiswirth, av beit din of Antwerp
 Zundel Kroizer, Haredi Israeli rabbi and author of Ohr Hachamah
 Aaron Aryeh Leifer, Nadvorna Rebbe
 Avraham Abba Leifer, Pittsburger Rebbe
 Zion Levy, chief rabbi of Panama
 Aharon Lichtenstein, rosh yeshiva of Yeshivat Har Etzion in Alon Shvut
 Gershon Liebman, rosh yeshiva of the Novardok Yeshiva network in France
 Aryeh Leib Malin, rosh yeshiva of Beth Hatalmud Rabbinical College
 Isser Zalman Meltzer, rosh yeshiva of Slutsk and Etz Chaim, Jerusalem
 Yisroel Ber Odesser, Breslov rabbi
 Chanoch Dov Padwa, av beit din of London
 Menachem Porush, legislator, educator, journalist
 Louis Isaac Rabinowitz, chief rabbi of South Africa and deputy mayor of Jerusalem
 Bezalel Rakow, Gateshead Rav
 Aharon Rokeach, Belzer Rebbe
 Tibor Rosenbaum, Hungarian-born Swiss rabbi and businessman
 Shulem Safrin, Komarno Rebbe
 Mordechai Schultz, Chicago Rabbi
 Naftali Shakovitzky, Gateshead Rav
 Chaim Shmuelevitz, rosh yeshiva of Yeshivas Mir, Jerusalem
 Akiva Sofer, av beit din of Pressburg
 Yochanan Sofer, leader of the Erlau (Eger) dynasty.
 Meshulam Dovid Soloveitchik, rosh yeshiva of Brisk
 Yitzchok Zev Soloveitchik, Brisker Rav
 Baruch Sorotzkin, Rosh Yeshivas Telz-Cleveland
 Zalman Sorotzkin, av beit din of Lutsk
 Nosson Meir Wachtfogel, mashgiach ruchani, Beth Medrash Govoha
 Eliezer Waldenberg, medical halakhist and member of the Jerusalem beit din
 Chaim Walkin, rabbi and lecturer
 Simcha Wasserman, Jerusalem rabbi
 Dov Berish Weidenfeld, av beit din of Tchebin (Trzebinia)
 Noah Weinberg, founder and rosh yeshiva of Aish HaTorah
 Yechiel Yaakov Weinberg, Orthodox rabbi, posek ("decisor" of Jewish law) and rosh yeshiva
 Shlomo Wolbe, mashgiach, Be'er Yaakov yeshiva
 Avraham Yoffen, rosh yeshiva of Beis Yosef Novardok
 Mordechai Leib Kaminetzky, Jerusalem rabbi
 Yitzhak Kaduri, Mekubal / kabbalist
 Mordechai Sharabi, Mekubal / kabbalist and Rosh Yeshiva of Yeshivat Nahar Shalom

Notable rabbis reinterred at Har HaMenuchot
 Chaim Joseph David Azulai, the Chida
 Yosef Yozel Horwitz, the Alter of Novardok
 Meir Shapiro, Rav of Lublin
 Menachem Ziemba, Rav of Warsaw

Zionist personalities buried at Har HaMenuchot
 Rachel Yanait Ben-Zvi
 Yitzhak Ben-Zvi
 Naftali Herz Imber

Other notable people buried at Har Hamenuchot
 Tuvia Bielski, leader of the Bielski partisans
 Dora Bloch, killed by Idi Amin after Operation Entebbe
 Udi, Ruth, Yoav, Elad, and Hadas Fogel, victims of the 2011 Itamar attack
 Yossef Kurt Gutfreund, one of the eleven victims of the Munich massacre 1972
 Yaakov Yosef Herman, American Orthodox pioneer
 Menachem Elon, former Deputy Chief Israeli Supreme Court
 Barno Itzhakova, Bukharian Jewish singer
 George Mantello, Hungarian Orthodox Jew. As First Secretary of El Salvador in Switzerland, he saved large number of Jews during the Holocaust by providing them with protection papers. He also publicized the Auschwitz Protocols.
 Miriam Monsonego, victim of the 2012 Toulouse and Montauban shootings
 Itzhak Nener, jurist and Vice President of Liberal International
 Paul Reichmann, Canadian businessman and member of the Reichmann family
 Yonatan, Arieh, and Gabriel Sandler, victims of the 2012 Toulouse and Montauban shootings
 Yona Bogale, first leader of the Ethiopian Jewish community in Israel
 The 7 Sassoon children killed in a Shabbat fire in Brooklyn NY
 Jacques Lipchitz, modernist sculptor
 Mordechai Omer, director of Tel Aviv Art Museum
 Peretz Smolenskin, writer of the Haskalah movement

See also
 Bereavement in Judaism

References

External links

 Burial in Jerusalem: The Har HaMenuchot Cemetery
 Kiddush Chelka Ceremony at Har HaMenuchos by the Belz Community

1951 establishments in Israel
Jewish cemeteries in Jerusalem
Geography of Jerusalem
Hills of Israel
Landforms of Jerusalem District
Cemeteries established in the 1950s